Roy Dana Call (February 16, 1950 – February 27, 2020) was an American film and television actor. He appeared in several films including 48 Hrs. (1982), Brewster's Millions (1985), At Close Range (1986), No Man's Land (1987), Colors (1988), Born on the Fourth of July (1989), Young Guns II (1990), State of Grace (1990), Waterworld (1995), Murder by Numbers (2002), Babel (2006), and Into the Wild (2007).

Life and career 
Call was born in Ogden, Utah. An early television appearance saw him in a supporting role on an episode of Trapper John, M.D., where he was cast and directed by director Leo Penn. He has since appeared in various films with Leo Penn, Sean Penn, Martin Sheen, Charlie Sheen, and Emilio Estevez, such as At Close Range, Colors, I Am Sam, Into the Wild, Judgment in Berlin, No Man's Land, State of Grace, The Weight of Water, and Young Guns II.

Call has also appeared in several of Walter Hill's films: 48 Hrs. (with Nick Nolte), Brewster's Millions (with John Candy), and Last Man Standing (with Bruce Willis). Other roles have included Babel (with Brad Pitt), Oliver Stone's Born on the Fourth of July (with Tom Cruise), Michael Mann's L.A. Takedown, Murder by Numbers (with Sandra Bullock), and Waterworld (with Kevin Costner).

Television appearances include Burn Notice, Cruel Doubt, the acclaimed CBS series EZ Streets, Murder, She Wrote, Timestalkers, and The X-Files (episode Miracle Man). He played Jude Andrews in Stephen King's Golden Years.

Call's recent stage work includes Blackout (a performance that Variety called "riveting"), The Speed of Darkness, Drift, and Good Bobby.

Call was born into a family that were members of the Church of Jesus Christ of Latter-day Saints. He left that Church in his early teens.  He married Nita Nickerson at the Saint Rose of Lima Catholic Church, in Layton, Utah on April 14, 1972.  They had no children and divorced in December 1981, but remained life-long friends. He died on February 27, 2020, from complications of back surgery at the age of 70.

Filmography

Awards 
Call was the winner of the 2010 Action On Film International Film Festival (AOF) "Legends Award".

References

External links 

2020 deaths
American male film actors
American male television actors
American male stage actors
People from Ogden, Utah
1950 births
Male actors from Utah
Weber State University alumni
Utah State University alumni
20th-century American male actors
21st-century American male actors
Former Latter Day Saints